Eucalyptus × kalangadooensis is a species of tree that is endemic to a small area in South Australia. It has smooth bark, lance-shaped adult leaves, flower buds in groups of between four and ten and top-shaped fruit. It is thought to be a hybrid between E. camaldulensis subsp. camaldulensis and either E. ovata or E. viminalis subsp. cygnetensis.

Description
Eucalyptus  × kalangadooensis is a tall tree with smooth bark.

The Australian Plant Census lists this species as a natural hybrid between E. camaldulensis subsp. camaldulensis and either E. ovata or E. viminalis subsp. cygnetensis.

Taxonomy and naming
Eucalyptus × kalangadooensis was first formally described in 1925 by Joseph Maiden and William Blakely in Journal and Proceedings of the Royal Society of New South Wales.

Distribution and habitat
This eucalypt is only known from near Kalangadoo and Mount Burr.

See also
List of Eucalyptus species

References

Flora of South Australia
kalangadooensis
Myrtales of Australia
Plants described in 1925
Taxa named by Joseph Maiden
Plant nothospecies